The serpent labret with articulated tongue is a gold Aztec lip plug from the mid-second millennium AD. Made of a gold, copper and silver alloy, it was cast via the lost-wax process; the tongue, cast individually, can be retracted or extended, and swings from side to side with its wearer's movement. The serpent is thought to represent Xiuhcoatl. The labret entered the collection of the Metropolitan Museum of Art with a 2016 purchase, and is considered "perhaps the finest Aztec gold ornament to survive the crucibles of the sixteenth century".

Description

It was cast via the lost-wax process, and is made of an alloy comprising 59.3 to 64.3% gold, 26.8 to 33.1% copper, and 7.5 to 8.8% silver. The tongue was cast as a separate piece, allowing it to be retracted or extended, and for it to swing from side to side with the movement of its wearer. The serpent is attached to a cylindrical plug, which has a wide and plain flange to hold the labret in place within the wearer's mouth. The piece is shaped like a serpent preparing to strike, with a curled eyebrow and snout, serrated teeth, and two fangs. Scales are represented below the lower jaw.

Provenance
The labret is in the permanent collection of the Metropolitan Museum of Art in New York City, which purchased the piece in 2016. Previously it had been owned by Heath McClung Steele from 1937 to 1949, and then by his children until 1978. After being sold at Sotheby's in New York on 22 November 1978 it passed into the collection of Jay C. Leff until 1981, and subsequently the collections of Judith Small Nash and Peter G. Wray, the latter of whom held the labret until 1985. It was next owned by Herbert L. Lucas, through 2004, and then became part of a private New York collection until its sale to the Met.

Exhibitions

The labret was displayed as part of the exhibition Golden Kingdoms: Luxury Arts in the Ancient Americas, at the J. Paul Getty Museum in Los Angeles from 16 September  2017 through 28 January 2018, and at the Metropolitan Museum of Art as part of the exhibition Golden Kingdoms: Luxury and Legacy in the Ancient Americas from 26 February 2018 through 28 May.

References

Bibliography
  
  
 

Aztec artifacts
Jewellery of the Metropolitan Museum of Art
Snakes in art